Aquin is commune in the Aquin Arrondissement, in the Sud department of Haiti.

Aquin may also refer to:

People
 Emmanuel Aquin (born 1968), Canadian novelist, screenwriter, editor, graphic artist and illustrator
 François Aquin (1929–2017), Canadian politician
 Hubert Aquin (1929–1977), Canadian novelist, political activist, essayist, filmmaker and editor

Places
 Aquin City, principal town of the Aquin commune
 Aquin Arrondissement, an administrative sub-division of the Sud department in southwestern Haiti

Other uses
 Aquin Catholic Schools, a private Catholic school system in Freeport, Illinois, USA
 Aquin Components, software company, based in Frankfurt, Germany
 The Quest for Saint Aquin, science fiction short story by Anthony Boucher originally published in 1951